KD Sri Indera Sakti is 4,300-ton, 100-meter multi-role support ship of the Royal Malaysian Navy (RMN) based in the Lumut Naval Base in Perak, Malaysia.

Major operation
The ship was sent to Somali waters to take over the role of the similar  to fight piracy in the Gulf of Aden in December 2008. In the same month, it successfully aided Chinese crane ship .

In 2009, KD Sri Indera Sakti dispatched two helicopters that successfully repelled two Somali pirate skiffs attempting to capture the Indian tanker MT Abul Kalam Azad.

References

Piracy in Somalia
Sri Indera Sakti-class support ships
1980 ships
Ships built in Bremen (state)